Football Delhi Women's Premier League is the top division of women's football league in the Indian union territory of Delhi. It has been founded under the current name in 2021. Inaugural season was played with 10 teams divided into 2 groups, with Hans FC becoming the champions. Tournament also serves as qualification for Indian Women's League.

League structure

Champions

References 

Football in Delhi
Women's football leagues in India
Sports leagues established in 2021